Parliamentary elections were held in Slovenia on 10 November 1996. The result was a victory for Liberal Democracy of Slovenia, which won 25 of the 90 seats. Party leader Janez Drnovsek was re-elected Prime Minister by the Parliament on 9 January 1997.

Results

References

Slovenia
1996 in Slovenia
Parliamentary elections in Slovenia
November 1996 events in Europe